Nazmi (also transliterated as Nadhmi) is an Arabic male given name, the pronunciation of the Arabic letter Ẓāʾ is often closer to a strong "d" sound, therefore the name's pronunciation differs based on the spoken varieties of Arabic and consequently in its transcription.

Given name
 Nadhmi Auchi, British Iraqi businessman
 Nazmi Avluca, Turkish sports wrestler
 Nazmi Bari (1929–2008), Turkish tennis player
 Nazmi Ziya Güran (1881–1937), Turkish impressionist painter
 Nazmi Mehmeti (1918-1995), Macedonian anti-communist
 Nadhmi Al-Nasr, Saudi executive
 Nazmi Ahmad Ahmad, an Arabic Boy

Surname
 Ali Nazmi (1878-1946), Azerbaijani poet

Arabic-language surnames
Arabic masculine given names
Turkish-language surnames
Turkish masculine given names